The following is a list of flags used in Belize. For more information about the national flag, see the Flag of Belize.

National flag

Government flag

Ethnic group flags

City flags

Historical flags

Political flags

See also 

 Flag of Belize
 Coat of arms of Belize

References 

Lists and galleries of flags
Flags